"Season of love" is Mai Kuraki's twenty-sixth single, released on February 14, 2007. It is her first collaboration with Aika Ohno and Cybersound since "Time After Time (Hana Mau Machi de)", nearly 4 years ago. "Season of Lve" was Kuraki's last single under Giza Studio.

Usage in media
 TV Asahi drama "Shin Kyoto Meikyuu Annai" theme song (#1)

Track listing

Charts

Oricon sales chart

External links
Kuraki Mai Official Website

Japanese television drama theme songs
2007 singles
Mai Kuraki songs
2007 songs
Songs written by Aika Ohno
Songs written by Mai Kuraki
Giza Studio singles
Song recordings produced by Daiko Nagato